Lacalma porphyrealis is a species of snout moth in the genus Lacalma. It was described by George Hamilton Kenrick in 1907 and is known from New Guinea and Australia.

References

Moths described in 1907
Epipaschiinae